Dangerous Curves is an American television series that aired on CBS as part of its late night umbrella series lineup, Crimetime After Primetime. The private detective series premiered in February 1992 and ran through May 1993, airing two seasons of 34 episodes. CBS continued to air reruns of the show between September and December 1993.

Plot
The series follows Gina McKay (Lise Cutter) and Holly Williams (Michael Michele), two former police officers, who work for the Personal Touch security service in Dallas, Texas, as they protect property and people from thieves and assassins. Early in the series, their boss is Marina Bonnelle (Diane Bellego), thus making Personal Touch security service an all-female operation. However she is replaced by Alexandre Dorleac (François-Éric Gendron), an agent for an Interpol-like agency that deals with international criminals and terrorists, expanding the focus of Gina's and Holly's casework. Gina's lover, Lt. Ozzie Bird, is a Dallas police detective who helps Gina and Holly with information and occasionally cases.

Cast
 Lise Cutter as Gina McKay
 Michael Michele as Holly Williams
 Gregory McKinney as Lt. Ozzie Bird
 Diane Bellego as Marina Bonnelle (season 1)
 François-Éric Gendron as Alexandre Dorleac (season 2)

Episodes

Series overview

Broadcast history
 Wednesdays 11:30 p.m.–12:30 a.m. (February 1992 – June 1992)
 Wednesdays 12:35 a.m.–1:35 a.m. (September 1992 – May 1993)

Season 1 (1992)

Season 2 (1992–93)

Reception
Dangerous Curves was not well received critically. David Hiltbrand of People magazine gave the show a grade of "C+" and commented that the show's "writing and acting are flat", but added "the pretty faces and itchy trigger fingers make this a good fit for CBS's late-night rotation, Crimetime After Primetime".  Ken Tucker of Entertainment Weekly dismissed the series as "CBS' latest addition to its ”Crime Time After Prime Time” schlock action hours", adding jokingly, "”It’s too tame to get you all hot and bothered!” is more like it."

References

External links
 
 

CBS original programming
1992 American television series debuts
1993 American television series endings
1990s American drama television series
English-language television shows